Kevin Stewart may refer to:

 Kevin Stewart (Australian politician) (1928–2006), former member of the New South Wales Legislative Assembly
 Kevin Stewart (Scottish politician) (born 1968), member of the Scottish Parliament, 2011–
 Kevin Stewart (footballer) (born 1993), English footballer

See also
 Kevin Stuart, New Zealand rugby union player